Pondicherry urban is the urban agglomeration area of Pondicherry region [Union Territory Of Puducherry] and a B-2 class city, which compromises  Municipalities of Pondicherry (city) and Oulgaret and urban areas of Villianur and Ariyankuppam Commune Panchayats.

Area-71 km2

Population-6,57,209.(According to 2011 census)

There are two  proposals by the Puducherry govt 1. To merge Pondicherry and Oulgaret Municipalities, & upgrade Pondicherry municipality into a municipal corporation. 2. To upgrade Villianur & Ariyankuppam Commune Panchayats into Municipalities.
which would increase the Pondicherry region's urban area  around 155 km2. of the total 292 km2.

Geography of Puducherry
Puducherry district
Puducherry